Larry McNeill (January 31, 1951 – December 29, 2004) was an American National Basketball Association player.

College career
McNeill played at college basketball at Marquette University, with the Warriors.

Professional career
McNeill was drafted in the second round of the 1973 NBA draft, by the Kansas City–Omaha Kings, and would play with the franchise until 1976. That year, he was traded to the New York Nets, for a third-round draft pick. In 1977, he signed as a free agent with the Golden State Warriors. The following two years, he signed as a free agent with the Buffalo Braves and Detroit Pistons. McNeil also suited up for several teams in the Philippine Basketball Association, once scoring a then record 88 points, in one local game, in 1983.  He also spent several seasons in the Continental Basketball Association with the Wilkes-Barre Barons, Utica Olympics, and Rochester Zeniths.

McNeill continues to hold the NBA record for the most field goals in a playoff game without a miss, going 12 for 12 in a playoff game in 1975, with the Kings.

References

1951 births
2004 deaths
African-American basketball players
American expatriate basketball people in Canada
American expatriate basketball people in the Philippines
American expatriate basketball people in Spain
American men's basketball players
Barangay Ginebra San Miguel players
Basketball players from North Carolina
Buffalo Braves players
CB Canarias players
Centers (basketball)
Detroit Pistons players
Golden State Warriors players
Kansas City Kings draft picks
Kansas City Kings players
Marquette Golden Eagles men's basketball players
New York Nets players
People from Hoke County, North Carolina
Philippine Basketball Association imports
Power forwards (basketball)
Rochester Zeniths players
Toronto Tornados players
Utica Olympics players
Wilkes-Barre Barons players
20th-century African-American sportspeople
21st-century African-American people